Neolithodes capensis is a species of king crab which is found in the Southern Ocean and the western Indian Ocean.

They have been found near Cape Point and around the Crozet and Kerguelen Islands in the subantarctic, and they are widespread in the Bellingshausen Sea on the Antarctic continental slope.

Neolithodes capensis closely resembles Neolithodes yaldwyni, another king crab of the Southern Ocean.

References 

King crabs
Crustaceans described in 1905
Crustaceans of the Indian Ocean
Crustaceans of South Africa
Fauna of the Crozet Islands
Fauna of the Kerguelen Islands
Fauna of the Southern Ocean
Taxa named by Thomas Roscoe Rede Stebbing